The International Mountaineering and Climbing Federation (UIAA) recognises eight-thousanders as the 14 mountains that are more than  in height above sea level, and are considered to be sufficiently independent of neighbouring peaks. There is no precise definition of the criteria used to assess independence, and, since 2012, the UIAA has been involved in a process to consider whether the list should be expanded to 20 mountains. All eight-thousanders are located in the Himalayan and Karakoram mountain ranges in Asia, and their summits are in the death zone.

From 1950 to 1964, all 14 eight-thousanders were summited in the summer (the first was Annapurna I in 1950, and the last was Shishapangma in 1964), and from 1980 to 2021, all 14 were summited in the winter (the first being Mount Everest in 1980, and the last being K2 in 2021).  On a variety of statistical techniques, the deadliest eight-thousander is Annapurna I (one death – climber or climber support – for every three summiters), followed by K2 and Nanga Parbat (one death for every four to five summiters), and then Dhaulagiri and Kangchenjunga (one for every six to seven summiters).

The first person to summit all 14 eight-thousanders was Italian Reinhold Messner in 1986, who did not use supplementary oxygen. In 2010, Spaniard Edurne Pasaban became the first woman to summit all 14, but with the aid of supplementary oxygen. In 2011, Austrian Gerlinde Kaltenbrunner became the first woman to summit all 14 without the aid of supplementary oxygen.  In 2013, South Korean Kim Chang-ho climbed all 14 in 7 years and 310 days, without the aid of supplementary oxygen. In 2019, British-Nepalese climber Nirmal Purja, climbed all 14 in 6 months and 6 days, with supplementary oxygen. In July 2022, Sanu Sherpa became the first person to summit all 14 eight-thousanders twice, which he did over the period 2006 to 2022.

Issues with false summits (e.g. Cho Oyu, Annapurna I and Dhaulagiri), or separated dual summits (e.g. Shishapangma and Manaslu), have led to disputed claims of ascents. In 2022, after several years of research, a team of experts reported that only three climbers, Ed Viesturs, Veikka Gustafsson and Nirmal Purja, had actually stood on the true summit of all 14 eight-thousanders.

Climbing history

First ascents

The first recorded attempt on an eight-thousander was when Albert F. Mummery, Geoffrey Hastings and J. Norman Collie tried to climb Pakistan's Nanga Parbat in 1895. The attempt failed when Mummery and two Gurkhas, Ragobir Thapa and Goman Singh, were killed by an avalanche.

The first recorded successful ascent of an eight-thousander was by the French Maurice Herzog and Louis Lachenal, who reached the summit of Annapurna on 3 June 1950 during the 1950 French Annapurna expedition. Due to its location in Tibet, Shishapangma was the last eight-thousander to be ascended, which was completed by a Chinese team led by Xu Jing in 1964 (western China's mountains were closed to foreign travel until 1978).

The first winter ascent of an eight-thousander was by a Polish team led by Andrzej Zawada on Mount Everest, with Leszek Cichy and Krzysztof Wielicki reaching the summit on 17 February 1980; all-Polish teams would complete nine of the first fourteen winter ascents of eight-thousanders. The final eight-thousander to be climbed in winter was K2, whose summit was ascended by a 10-person Nepalese team on 16 January 2021.

Only two climbers have completed more than one first ascent of an eight-thousander, Hermann Buhl (Nanga Parbat and Broad Peak) and Kurt Diemberger (Broad Peak and Dhaulagiri). Buhl's summit of Nanga Parbat in 1953 is notable as being the only solo first ascent of one of the eight-thousanders. The Polish climber Jerzy Kukuczka is noted for creating over ten new routes on various eight-thousander mountains.  Italian climber Simone Moro made the first winter ascent of four eight-thousander mountains (Shishapangma, Makalu, Gasherbrum II, and Nanga Parbat), while two Polish climbers have each made three first winter ascents of an eight-thousander, Krzysztof Wielicki (Everest, Kangchenjunga, and Lhotse) and Jerzy Kukuczka (Dhaulagiri I, Kangchenjunga, and Annapurna I).

All 14

On 16 October 1986, Italian Reinhold Messner became the first person to climb all 14 eight-thousanders. In 1987, Polish climber Jerzy Kukuczka became the second person to accomplish this feat. Messner summited each of the 14 peaks without the aid of bottled oxygen, a feat that was only repeated by the Swiss Erhard Loretan nine years later in 1995 (Kukuczka had used supplementary oxygen while summiting Everest and on no other eight-thousander).

On 17 May 2010, Spanish climber Edurne Pasaban became the first woman to summit all 14 eight-thousanders. In August 2011, Austrian climber Gerlinde Kaltenbrunner became the first woman to climb the 14 eight-thousanders without the use of supplementary oxygen.

The first couple and team to summit all 14 eight-thousanders were the Italians Nives Meroi (who was the second woman to accomplish this feat without supplementary oxygen), and her husband  on 11 May 2017. The couple climbed alpine style, without the use of supplementary oxygen or other support.

Nepali mountain guide Kami Rita, holds the record for the most ascents of an eight-thousander peak at 39, a feat he achieved on 7 May 2022 by summiting Everest for the 26th time (which was also a record for the most summits of Everest by a climber).

On 20 May 2013, South Korean climber Kim Chang-ho set a new speed record of climbing all 14 eight-thousanders, without the use of supplementary oxygen, in 7 years and 310 days.  On 29 October 2019, the British-Nepali climber Nirmal Purja set a speed record for climbing all 14 eight-thousanders, with the use of supplementary oxygen, in 6 months and 6 days.

In July 2022, Sanu Sherpa became the first person to summit all 14 eight-thousanders twice.  He started with Cho Oyu in 2006, and completed the double by summiting Gasherbrum II in July 2022.

Deadliest

The extreme altitude and the fact that the summits of all eight-thousanders lie in the Death Zone mean that climber mortality (or death rate), is particularly high.  Two metrics are quoted to establish a death rate (i.e. broad and narrow) that are used to rank the eight-thousanders in order of deadliest (note that they are also the world's overall deadliest mountains).

 Broad death rate: The first metric is the ratio of successful climbers summiting to total deaths on the mountain over a given period.  The Guinness Book of World Records uses this metric to name Annapurna I as the deadliest eight-thousander, and the world's deadliest mountain with roughly one person dying for every three people who successfully summit, i.e. a ratio of circa 30%. Using consistent data from 1950 to 2012, mountaineering statistician Eberhard Jurgalski (see table below) used this metric to show Annapurna is the deadliest mountain (31.9%), followed by K2 (26.5%), Nanga Parbat (20.3%), Dhaulagiri (15.4%) and Kangchenjunga (14.1%).  Other statistical sources including MountainIQ, used a mix of data periods from 1900 to Spring 2021 but had similar results showing Annapurna still being the deadliest mountain (27.2%), followed by K2 (22.8%), Nanga Parbat (20.75%), Kangchenjunga (15%), and Dhaulagiri (13.5%).  Cho Oyu as the safest at 1.4%.
 Narrow death rate: The drawback of the first metric is that it includes the deaths of any support climbers or climbing sherpas that went above base camp in assisting the climb; therefore, rather than being the probability that a climber will die attempting to summit an eight-thousander, it is more akin to the total human cost in getting a climber to the summit. In the Himalayan Database (HDB) tables, the climber (or member) "Death Rate" is the ratio of deaths above base camp, of all climbers who were hoping to summit and who went above base camp (calculated for 1950 to 2009), and is closer to a true probability of death (see table below).  The data is only for the Nepalese Himalaya and therefore does not include K2 or Nanga Parbat.  HDB estimates that the probability of death for a climber who is attempting the summit of an eight-thousander is still highest for Annapurna I (4%), followed by Kangchenjunga (3%) and Dhaulagiri (3%); the safest mountain is still Cho Oyu at 0.6%.

The summary tables from the HDB report for all mountains above 8,000 meters also imply that the death rate of climbers for the period 1990 to 2009 (e.g. modern expeditions), is roughly half that of the combined 1950 to 2009 period, i.e. climbing is becoming safer for the climbers attempting the summit.

List of first ascents 
From 1950 to 1964, all 14 of the eight-thousanders were summited in the summer (the first was Annapurna I in 1950, and the last was Shishapangma in 1964), and from 1980 to 2021, all 14 were summited in the winter (the first being Everest in 1980, and the last being K2 in 2021).

List of climbers of all 14 

There is no single undisputed source for verified Himalayan ascents; however, Elizabeth Hawley's The Himalayan Database, is considered as an important source for verified ascents for the Nepalese Himalayas.  Online databases of Himalayan ascents pay close regard to The Himalayan Database, including the website AdventureStats.com, and the Eberhard Jurgalski List. 

Various mountaineering journals, including the Alpine Journal and the American Alpine Journal,  maintain extensive records and archives on expeditions to the eight-thousanders, but do not always opine on disputed ascents, and nor do they maintain registers of verified ascents.

Verified ascents

The "No O2" column lists people who have climbed all 14 eight-thousanders without supplementary oxygen.

Disputed ascents
Claims have been made for summiting all 14 peaks for which not enough evidence was provided to verify the ascent; the disputed ascent in each claim is shown in parentheses in the table below.  In most cases, the Himalayan chronicler Elizabeth Hawley is considered a definitive source regarding the facts of the dispute. Her The Himalayan Database is the source for other online Himalayan ascent databases (e.g. AdventureStats.com).  The  Eberhard Jurgalski List is also another important source for independent verification of claims to have summited all 14 eight-thousanders.

Verification issues

A recurrent problem with verification is the confirmation that the climber reached the true peak of the eight-thousander.  Eight-thousanders present unique problems in this regard as they are so infrequently summited, their summits have not yet been exhaustively surveyed, and summiting climbers are often suffering the extreme altitude and weather effects of being in the death zone.

Cho Oyu for example, is a recurrent problem eight-thousander as its true peak is a small hump about a thirty minutes walk into the large flat summit plateau that lies in the death zone. The true peak is often obscured in very poor weather, and this led to the disputed ascent (per the table above) of British climber, Alan Hinkes (who has refused to re-climb the peak).  Shishapangma is another problem peak because of its dual summits, which despite being close in height, are up to two hours climbing time apart and require the crossing of an exposed and dangerous snow ridge. When Hawley judged that Ed Viesturs had not reached the true summit of Shishapangma (which she deduced from his summit photos and interviews), he then re-climbed the mountain to definitively establish his ascent.

In a May 2021 interview with the New York Times, Jurgalski pointed out further issues with false summits on Annapurna I (a long ridge with multiple summits), Dhaulagiri (misleading false summit metal pole), and Manaslu (additional sharp and dangerous ridge to the true summit, like Shishapangma), noting that of the existing 44 accepted claims (as per the table earlier), at least 7 had serious question marks (these were in addition to the table of disputed ascents), and even noting that "It is possible that no one has ever been on the true summit of all 14 of the 8,000-meter peaks". In June 2021, Australian climber Damien Gildea wrote an article in the American Alpine Journal on the work that Jurgalski and a team of international experts were doing in this area, including publishing detailed surveys of the problem summits using data from the German Aerospace Center.

In July 2022, Jurgalski posted conclusions of the team's research (the wider team being of Rodolphe Popier and Tobias Pantel of The Himalayan Database, and Damien Gildea, Federico Bernardi, Bob Schelfhout Aubertijn, and Thaneswar Guragai).  According to their analysis, only three climbers, Ed Viesturs, Veikka Gustafsson and Nirmal Purja have stood on the true summit of all 14 eight-thousanders, and no female climber had yet done so.  Viesturs is also the first to have done so without the use of oxygen. Jurgalski allowed for the fact that they had deliberately not stood on the true summit of Kangchenjunga out of religious respect.  The team has not formally published their work, and according to Popier, they had not decided about "the best respectful form to present it".

Proposed expansion

In 2012, to relieve capacity pressure and overcrowding on the world's highest mountain, greater restrictions were placed on expeditions to the summit of Mount Everest.  To address the growing capacity constraints, Nepal lobbied the International Climbing and Mountaineering Federation (or UIAA) to reclassify five subsidiary summits (two on Lhotse and three on Kanchenjunga), as standalone eight-thousanders, while Pakistan lobbied for a sixth subsidiary summit (on Broad Peak) as a standalone eight-thousander. See table below for list of all subsidiary summits of eight-thousander mountains.

In 2012, the UIAA initiated the ARUGA Project, with an aim to see if these six new -plus peaks could feasibly achieve international recognition.

, there has been no conclusion by the UIAA and the proposals appear to have been set aside.

Gallery

See also

 Explorers Grand Slam, the North Pole, the South Pole, and the Seven Summits
 List of deaths on eight-thousanders
 List of Mount Everest summiters by number of times to the summit
 List of ski descents of eight-thousanders
 Three Poles Challenge, the North Pole, the South Pole, and Mount Everest
 Volcanic Seven Summits, the highest volcanos on each continent
Fourteener, peak with at least 14,000 ft. elevation

Notes

References

External links
 8000ers.com, a site dedicated to statistics on 8000m peaks and climbs
 PeakBagger.com World 8000-meter Peaks, a database of global peaks
 The Himalayan Database, statistics on Nepalese Himalayan (but not Pakistan Himalaya) climbs from 1905 to 2018
 Graphical Interface for The Himalayan Database
 AdventureStats.com (High Altitude Mountaineering), a site dedicated to recording adventure statistics
 NASA Earth Observatory: The Eight-Thousanders
 Eight Thousanders Tracking Expeditons On Line from Alpinismonline Magazine

 
Mountains by height
Lists of mountains
Mountaineering
Oronyms
Peak bagging
Mountains of the Himalayas